Bibhu Mohapatra (born 7 June 1972 in Rourkela, Odisha, India) is a New York-based fashion designer and costume designer.

Early life and education 

Mohapatra (Brahmin) grew up in Rourkela, Odisha, on the East Coast of India. As a young child, his mother helped him learn how to sew on her machine and he used old textiles, such as old saris, to learn sewing. In 1996 he moved to America and earned a master's degree from Utah State University. In 1999 he moved to New York City and enrolled at the Fashion Institute of Technology. He worked at the American fashion labels Halson and J.Mendel.

Career 
In 2008 Mohapatra resigned from J. Mendel in order to establish his label, Bibhu Mohapatra -Purple Label. Since then, he has presented many collections of luxury women's ready to wear, couture and fur under his name in New York, Mumbai, New Delhi, Frankfurt, Beijing, Houston, Palm Beach, Tampa, Houston, Mexico, Costa Rica.
His collections are sold by many boutiques around the world.

Mohapatra served as the primary costume designer for the Verdi opera Aida debuted during the 2012 Summer season at the Glimmerglass Opera in Cooperstown, NY.
Bibhu was invited to design Costumes for the post covid reopening of The Washionton National Opera at Kennedy Center in Washionton DC in 2021 in honor of Supreme Court Justice Ruth Bader Ginsberg.

First Lady Michelle Obama is Mohapatra's client and he feels she reflects his designs well.

On the charitable front, Bibhu has designed several collections of hand woven silk sari to help the traditional hand weavers in his home state of Odisha in India. Bibhu is a co-founder of The India Society. India Society is a New York-based organization set up to assist students of fashion and fine art with tuition and internships at US based Universities.

Mohapatra Launched a collection of diamond jewelry in India in 2016 with ForeverMark a division of Debeers. ForeverMark and Mohapatra have been associating since 2016. In 2019 ForeverMark provided an assortment of diamond jewelry, which complimented his Fall-Winter 2019 collection during New York Fashion Week. The first collection is called Artemis by Bibhu Mohapatra. "Artemis by Bibhu Mohapatra" The second Debeers collection was launched in 2019. With his 2019 fall collection, he passed the 10-year mark.

Mohapatra lives and works in New York City.

His creations have been featured in many fashion magazines including In Touch Weekly. DNA, New York, Time, Forbes, The Wall Street Journal, Marie Claire, Gotham and Vogue.

Mohapatra's Spring 2021 collection was inspired by Amrita Sher-Gil. For the 2021 Met Gala, Mohapatra dressed Puma creative director, June Ambrose, in a white silk faille gown that was hand embroidered by Indian artisans.

Awards and honors 
 On May 27, 2010, Mohapatra received the "Young Innovator Award" from the National Arts Club.
 In June 2010, he was elected a member of the Council of Fashion Designers of America.
 In April 2013, SCAD Atlanta presented the exhibition "Surface" by Bibhu Mohapatra, an exhibition encompassing work from many seasons.
 In June 2013, Mohapatra was a finalist for the 2014 International Woolmark Prize.

References 

1972 births
Living people
American fashion designers
American costume designers
Fashion Institute of Technology alumni
Indian male fashion designers
Utah State University alumni
American jewelry designers
American people of Indian descent
American businesspeople
Artists from Odisha
LGBT fashion designers